Mayyanad  is a village in Kollam district in the state of Kerala, India.

Mayyanad can be reached by frequent buses from Kollam city and Kottiyam town and by local train from Kollam and Thiruvananthapuram. The bridge connecting Mayyand and Paravur was completed in 2012, making travel to Kollam city easier.Anand AB the well known social worker from mayyanad

Location
Mayyanad is situated on the banks of the Paravur Lake and has an Arabian Sea coastline noted for its fishing. 
Mayyanad railway station is one among the major railway stations in Kollam district.

Landmarks
Several temples, churches and mosques are situated in Mayyanad including the Umayanalloor Sri Balasubramanya Swami Temple and Our lady of immaculate conception church. Tourists are attracted to the location by the meeting of a lagoon with the sea while the long sandy scenic beaches are ideal for swimming.

Education
Schools located in Mayyanad Village are

Notable people
 Mayyanad was the birthplace of C. Kesavan (1891–1969), the Chief Minister of Travancore-Cochin during 1950–1952.
 C. V. Kunhiraman (1871–1949), a social reformer, journalist and the founder of Kerala Kaumudi daily

Kerala Kaumudi
The Malayalam daily newspaper Kerala Kaumudi was founded in Mayyanad in 1911.

References

Villages in Kollam district